Omar Mohamed Fathy (born 10 February 1999) is an Egyptian artistic gymnast. He won the gold medal in the all-around at the 2021 African Championships, silver in the all-around with four event golds at the 2022 African Championships, and qualified for the 2020 Olympic Games, he finished fifty-first in the all-around during the qualification round.

References

External links
 
 
 

1999 births
Living people
Egyptian male artistic gymnasts
Sportspeople from Alexandria
Gymnasts at the 2020 Summer Olympics
Olympic gymnasts of Egypt
Gymnasts at the 2022 Mediterranean Games
Mediterranean Games competitors for Egypt
21st-century Egyptian people